Dupond may refer to:

Patrick Dupond
Éric Dupond-Moretti
Dupont et Dupond

See also
 Dupont (disambiguation)